Santa Okot  is a Ugandan politician, women's activist  and educator who serves as the Member of Parliament representing Pader District (Aruu North) in the 11th Ugandan Parliament(2021-2026)  and affiliated to the  People's Progressive Party as a political party. Santa is the only MP in the 11th Parliament belonging to the People's Progressive Party. She is also the former member of  the seventh Parliament of Uganda. In the 2001, she was the Woman Member of Parliament for Pader District representing the people of Aruu County under the National Resistance Movement political party. In 2006, she contested as the  Member of Parliament but lost. She is known for being critical  of the government for instance she has been using social media when presidential term limits were lifted in order to hold government leaders accountable.

Education 
She holds a bachelor's degree in Education.

Career 
Santa is a school teacher by profession. She is an activist for women and children. Santa worked as a Policy facilitator at African Leadership Institute. She is currently the Deputy Secretary General of People's Progressive Party. She is also a Certified  Peace Builder and Negotiator.  In PPP, Ms Okot is the chairperson for the women's league representing the northern region.

Other responsibilities 
She was a peace negotiator between the government of Uganda and the LRA, Rebels known for abducting, miming and killing millions of Ugandans from Northern part of Uganda.

See also 

 List of members of the eleventh Parliament of Uganda
 List of members of the seventh Parliament of Uganda
 Beatrice Atim Anywar
 Joseph Kony
 Pader District
 Parliament of Uganda
 Member of Parliament
 National Resistance Movement
 People's Progressive Party

External links 

 Website of the Parliament of Uganda.
 Santa Okot on Linkedin
 Santa Okot on Twitter
 Santa Okot on Facebook.

References 

Living people
Acholi people
People from Pader District
People from Northern Region, Uganda
Members of the Parliament of Uganda
Women members of the Parliament of Uganda
Ugandan educators
Ugandan Bush War
Ugandan people
Ugandan activists
Year of birth missing (living people)
21st-century Ugandan politicians
21st-century Ugandan women politicians